Amy Fruhwirth (born July 23, 1968) is an American professional golfer who played on the LPGA Tour.

Fruhwirth was born in Cypress, California. She played college golf at Arizona State University where she was a three-time All-American. In her amateur career, she won the 1991 California Women's Amateur and U.S. Women's Amateur and 1992 U.S. Women's Amateur Public Links. She played on the U.S. Curtis Cup team in 1992. She also finished runner-up in the 1985 U.S. Girl's Junior.

Fruhwirth played on the LPGA Tour from 1993 to 2004, winning once in 1998.

She was inducted into the Sun Devil Women's Golf Hall of Fame in 2005.

Amateur wins
1991 California Women's Amateur, U.S. Women's Amateur
1992 U.S. Women's Amateur Public Links

Professional wins (2)

LPGA Tour wins (1)

Other wins (1)
1997 JCPenney Classic (with Clarence Rose)

Team appearances
Amateur
Curtis Cup (representing the United States): 1992

References

External links

American female golfers
Arizona State Sun Devils women's golfers
LPGA Tour golfers
Winners of ladies' major amateur golf championships
Golfers from California
Golfers from Scottsdale, Arizona
People from Cypress, California
1968 births
Living people